Javier "Javi" Lara Grande (born 4 December 1985) is a Spanish professional footballer who plays as a central midfielder for AD Alcorcón.

Club career
Born in Montoro, Córdoba, Lara graduated from local Córdoba CF's youth setup, and made his senior debut with the reserves in the 2003–04 season, in the Tercera División. After Segunda División B loan stints with CD Villanueva, Real Unión and Écija Balompié, he moved to another reserve team, UD Almería B, in August 2007.

In the summer of 2008, Lara joined RSD Alcalá also of the fourth division. On 20 July 2009, he signed a two-year contract with Elche CF in the Segunda División. He played his first match as a professional on 3 September 2009, starting and featuring the full 90 minutes in a 3–2 away loss against FC Cartagena in the second round of the Copa del Rey. He made his league debut three days later, coming on as a second-half substitute in the 4–1 defeat at CD Numancia.

On 29 January 2010, after being sparingly used by the Andalusians, Lara was loaned to CD Alcoyano until June. He then moved to Valencia CF's B team in January 2011 after six months of inactivity, following which he competed in division three with Lucena CF and Alcoyano.

On 17 July 2013, Lara signed a one-year deal with SD Ponferradina. On 24 June of the following year, he moved to SD Eibar, recently promoted to La Liga. He made his debut in the Spanish top flight on 24 August 2014, starting and scoring the game's only goal (also the club's first ever in the competition) through a free kick in a win against Real Sociedad at the Ipurua Municipal Stadium.

Lara moved abroad at the age of nearly 30, joining ATK in the Indian Super League on 17 July 2015. He scored his first goal for the team on 13 October in their first home game of the season, a 2–1 victory over Kerala Blasters FC with Pelé in attendance at the Salt Lake Stadium.

In November 2015, after being ruled out of the season due to an injury, Lara was consequently released and replaced by his compatriot Jorge Alonso. On 2 February of the following year, he returned to his home country after agreeing to a short-term deal at CD Tenerife.

On 12 August 2016, Lara returned to India and Atlético Kolkata. On 10 January 2017, he signed for Córdoba until 30 June.

Lara returned to Spain in August 2019, with the 33-year-old joining UD Ibiza for two seasons as a free agent. He was a regular starter in the side's first-ever promotion to the second division in 2021, before leaving on 18 May 2022.

On 4 July 2022, Lara signed for AD Alcorcón of the Primera Federación.

Club statistics

References

External links

1985 births
Living people
Sportspeople from the Province of Córdoba (Spain)
Spanish footballers
Footballers from Andalusia
Association football midfielders
La Liga players
Segunda División players
Segunda División B players
Tercera División players
Primera Federación players
Córdoba CF B players
CD Villanueva players
Real Unión footballers
Écija Balompié players
UD Almería B players
RSD Alcalá players
Elche CF players
CD Alcoyano footballers
Valencia CF Mestalla footballers
Lucena CF players
SD Ponferradina players
SD Eibar footballers
CD Tenerife players
Córdoba CF players
UD Ibiza players
AD Alcorcón footballers
Indian Super League players
ATK (football club) players
Spanish expatriate footballers
Expatriate footballers in India
Spanish expatriate sportspeople in India